is the third single by American-born Japanese recording artist AKINO. It is the first single that also features her brothers Akashi and Aiki and sister Kanasa, backing her up as their band bless4. It is used as the opening theme of the anime Aquarion Evol, the sequel to Genesis of Aquarion for which AKINO also performed the theme songs. On her blog, AKINO described the song as having gospel stylings. The single's B-side  serves as Evols ending theme and is a duet between AKINO and her younger brother AIKI. AKINO described it as a love song, but she stated that it was embarrassing to do this as the first duet with her brother. Both songs were written by Gabriela Robin and composed and arranged by Yoko Kanno.

"Kimi no Shinwa" peaked on the Oricon's weekly single charts at number 3, remaining on the charts for 3 weeks. It also charted at 13 on the Oricon's monthly charts in February 2012, peaked at number 8 on the Billboard Japan Hot 100, number 3 on Billboard Japan's Hot Singles Sales chart, and number 2 on Billboard Japan's Hot Animation chart. AKINO also noted that the song and its B-side filled the top two spots of the iTunes Store's anime theme song rankings.

Track listing
"Kimi no Shinwa ~ Aquarion Dai 2 Shou" – 5:32
"Gekkō Symphonia" – 3:55
"Kimi no Shinwa ~ Aquarion Dai 2 Shou" (Instrumental) – 5:32
"Gekkō Symphonia" (Instrumental) – 3:51

References

2012 singles
Anime songs
Genesis of Aquarion
Songs written by Yoko Kanno
2012 songs